The 6th constituency of Calvados is a French legislative constituency in the Calvados département. Like the other 576 French constituencies, it elects one MP using the two-round system, with a run-off if no candidate receives over 50% of the vote in the first round.

Historic representation

Election results

2022

 
 
 
 
 
 
 
|-
| colspan="8" bgcolor="#E9E9E9"|
|-

2017

2012

|- style="background-color:#E9E9E9;text-align:center;"
! colspan="2" rowspan="2" style="text-align:left;" | Candidate
! rowspan="2" colspan="2" style="text-align:left;" | Party
! colspan="2" | 1st round
! colspan="2" | 2nd round
|- style="background-color:#E9E9E9;text-align:center;"
! width="75" | Votes
! width="30" | %
! width="75" | Votes
! width="30" | %
|-
| style="background-color:" |
| style="text-align:left;" | Alain Tourret
| style="text-align:left;" | Radical Party of the Left
| PRG
| 
| 41.47%
| 
| 53.27%
|-
| style="background-color:" |
| style="text-align:left;" | Jean-Yves Cousin
| style="text-align:left;" | Union for a Popular Movement
| UMP
| 
| 37.55%
| 
| 46.73%
|-
| style="background-color:" |
| style="text-align:left;" | Marie-Françoise Leboeuf
| style="text-align:left;" | Front National
| FN
| 
| 10.65%
| colspan="2" style="text-align:left;" |
|-
| style="background-color:" |
| style="text-align:left;" | Viviane Boufrou
| style="text-align:left;" | Left Front
| FG
| 
| 3.75%
| colspan="2" style="text-align:left;" |
|-
| style="background-color:" |
| style="text-align:left;" | Laurent Decker
| style="text-align:left;" | Europe Ecology – The Greens
| EELV
| 
| 3.41%
| colspan="2" style="text-align:left;" |
|-
| style="background-color:" |
| style="text-align:left;" | Hubert Heuze
| style="text-align:left;" | Radical Party
| PRV
| 
| 0.90%
| colspan="2" style="text-align:left;" |
|-
| style="background-color:" |
| style="text-align:left;" | Serge Lezement
| style="text-align:left;" | Miscellaneous Left
| DVG
| 
| 0.69%
| colspan="2" style="text-align:left;" |
|-
| style="background-color:" |
| style="text-align:left;" | Gérard Leroy
| style="text-align:left;" | Far Left
| EXG
| 
| 0.61%
| colspan="2" style="text-align:left;" |
|-
| style="background-color:" |
| style="text-align:left;" | Pascale Georget
| style="text-align:left;" | Far Left
| EXG
| 
| 0.50%
| colspan="2" style="text-align:left;" |
|-
| style="background-color:" |
| style="text-align:left;" | Christiane Herouard
| style="text-align:left;" | Miscellaneous Right
| DVD
| 
| 0.49%
| colspan="2" style="text-align:left;" |
|-
| colspan="8" style="background-color:#E9E9E9;"|
|- style="font-weight:bold"
| colspan="4" style="text-align:left;" | Total
| 
| 100%
| 
| 100%
|-
| colspan="8" style="background-color:#E9E9E9;"|
|-
| colspan="4" style="text-align:left;" | Registered voters
| 
| style="background-color:#E9E9E9;"|
| 
| style="background-color:#E9E9E9;"|
|-
| colspan="4" style="text-align:left;" | Blank/Void ballots
| 
| 1.86%
| 
| 2.60%
|-
| colspan="4" style="text-align:left;" | Turnout
| 
| 61.64%
| 
| 62.65%
|-
| colspan="4" style="text-align:left;" | Abstentions
| 
| 38.36%
| 
| 37.35%
|-
| colspan="8" style="background-color:#E9E9E9;"|
|- style="font-weight:bold"
| colspan="6" style="text-align:left;" | Result
| colspan="2" style="background-color:" | PRG gain from UMP
|}

2007

|- style="background-color:#E9E9E9;text-align:center;"
! colspan="2" rowspan="2" style="text-align:left;" | Candidate
! rowspan="2" colspan="2" style="text-align:left;" | Party
! colspan="2" | 1st round
! colspan="2" | 2nd round
|- style="background-color:#E9E9E9;text-align:center;"
! width="75" | Votes
! width="30" | %
! width="75" | Votes
! width="30" | %
|-
| style="background-color:" |
| style="text-align:left;" | Jean-Yves Cousin
| style="text-align:left;" | Union for a Popular Movement
| UMP
| 
| 46.88%
| 
| 54.83%
|-
| style="background-color:" |
| style="text-align:left;" | Alain Tourret
| style="text-align:left;" | Radical Party of the Left
| PRG
| 
| 29.28%
| 
| 45.17%
|-
| style="background-color:" |
| style="text-align:left;" | Franck Lelievre
| style="text-align:left;" | Democratic Movement
| MoDem
| 
| 6.55%
| colspan="2" style="text-align:left;" |
|-
| style="background-color:" |
| style="text-align:left;" | Jean-Baptiste Lemazurier
| style="text-align:left;" | Front National
| FN
| 
| 3.26%
| colspan="2" style="text-align:left;" |
|-
| style="background-color:" |
| style="text-align:left;" | Pascal Giloire
| style="text-align:left;" | The Greens
| VEC
| 
| 2.96%
| colspan="2" style="text-align:left;" |
|-
| style="background-color:" |
| style="text-align:left;" | Didier Vergy
| style="text-align:left;" | Hunting, Fishing, Nature, Traditions
| CPNT
| 
| 2.51%
| colspan="2" style="text-align:left;" |
|-
| style="background-color:" |
| style="text-align:left;" | Gérard Leroy
| style="text-align:left;" | Far Left
| EXG
| 
| 2.20%
| colspan="2" style="text-align:left;" |
|-
| style="background-color:" |
| style="text-align:left;" | Claudine Carin
| style="text-align:left;" | Communist
| PCF
| 
| 1.23%
| colspan="2" style="text-align:left;" |
|-
| style="background-color:" |
| style="text-align:left;" | Sylvie Bernard
| style="text-align:left;" | Ecologist
| ECO
| 
| 1.10%
| colspan="2" style="text-align:left;" |
|-
| style="background-color:" |
| style="text-align:left;" | Anne Flambard
| style="text-align:left;" | Far Left
| EXG
| 
| 0.98%
| colspan="2" style="text-align:left;" |
|-
| style="background-color:" |
| style="text-align:left;" | Isabelle Peltre
| style="text-align:left;" | Far Left
| EXG
| 
| 0.90%
| colspan="2" style="text-align:left;" |
|-
| style="background-color:" |
| style="text-align:left;" | Véronique Roulle
| style="text-align:left;" | Movement for France
| MPF
| 
| 0.88%
| colspan="2" style="text-align:left;" |
|-
| style="background-color:" |
| style="text-align:left;" | Stéphanie Fouque
| style="text-align:left;" | Independent
| DIV
| 
| 0.52%
| colspan="2" style="text-align:left;" |
|-
| style="background-color:" |
| style="text-align:left;" | Françoise Levaigneur
| style="text-align:left;" | Far Right
| EXD
| 
| 0.39%
| colspan="2" style="text-align:left;" |
|-
| style="background-color:" |
| style="text-align:left;" | Fanny Anne
| style="text-align:left;" | Independent
| DIV
| 
| 0.27%
| colspan="2" style="text-align:left;" |
|-
| style="background-color:" |
| style="text-align:left;" | Michel Menneson
| style="text-align:left;" | Miscellaneous Right
| DVD
| 
| 0.09%
| colspan="2" style="text-align:left;" |
|-
| colspan="8" style="background-color:#E9E9E9;"|
|- style="font-weight:bold"
| colspan="4" style="text-align:left;" | Total
| 
| 100%
| 
| 100%
|-
| colspan="8" style="background-color:#E9E9E9;"|
|-
| colspan="4" style="text-align:left;" | Registered voters
| 
| style="background-color:#E9E9E9;"|
| 
| style="background-color:#E9E9E9;"|
|-
| colspan="4" style="text-align:left;" | Blank/Void ballots
| 
| 1.92%
| 
| 2.69%
|-
| colspan="4" style="text-align:left;" | Turnout
| 
| 63.77%
| 
| 63.51%
|-
| colspan="4" style="text-align:left;" | Abstentions
| 
| 36.23%
| 
| 36.49%
|-
| colspan="8" style="background-color:#E9E9E9;"|
|- style="font-weight:bold"
| colspan="6" style="text-align:left;" | Result
| colspan="2" style="background-color:" | UMP HOLD
|}

2002

 
 
 
 
 
 
|-
| colspan="8" bgcolor="#E9E9E9"|
|-

1997

 
 
 
 
 
 
 
 
|-
| colspan="8" bgcolor="#E9E9E9"|
|-

Sources
 Official results of French elections from 1998: 

6